Hopliancistrus tricornis is the only species of the genus Hopliancistrus of suckermouth armored catfish. This species reaches a length of  SL.  It is endemic to Brazil and can be found in the Tapajós and Xingu River basins. This species appears similar to members Lasiancistrus, however it lacks the synapomorphies and has five rows of plates on the caudal peduncle instead of three like those found in Lasiancistrus. It is characterized by three stout, strongly curved odontodes on either side of the head in males.

References

Ancistrini
Fish of South America
Fish of Brazil
Endemic fauna of Brazil
Taxa named by Isaäc J. H. Isbrücker
Taxa named by Han Nijssen
Monotypic fish genera
Monotypic ray-finned fish genera
Monotypic freshwater fish genera